Behenjy is a town and commune in Madagascar. It belongs to the district of Ambatolampy, which is a part of Vakinankaratra Region. The population of the commune was estimated to be approximately 18,000 in 2001 commune census.

Economy
Behenjy is the Malagasy capitol of Foie gras. More than 70% of its population lives of this activity.

Transport
The town is situated on one of the principal roads of Madagascar, the RN 7 that connects the city with the capital Antananarivo and Antsirabe.
Benhenjy is situated at 44 km south of Antananarivo and 122 km north of Antsirabe.

Primary and junior level secondary education are available in town. The majority 50% of the population of the commune are farmers, while an additional 30% receives their livelihood from raising livestock. The most important crop is rice, while other important products are vegetables, beans, maize and cassava.  Industry and services provide employment for 15% and 5% of the population, respectively.

References and notes 

Populated places in Vakinankaratra